Melba is a genus of ant-loving beetles in the family Staphylinidae. There are about 13 described species in Melba.

Species
These 13 species belong to the genus Melba:

 Melba caviceps Raffray, 1909 g
 Melba clypeata (Reitter, 1883) i c g
 Melba crassipes Raffray, 1908 g
 Melba fleutiauxi Raffray, 1890 g
 Melba frontalis Raffray, 1908 g
 Melba gibbula (Reitter, 1883) i c g
 Melba maja (Brendel, 1892) i c g
 Melba parvula (LeConte, 1849) i c g b
 Melba quercae Chandler, 1985 i c g
 Melba simplex (LeConte, 1878) i c g
 Melba sulcatula Casey, 1897 i c g b
 Melba temporalis Raffray, 1909 g
 Melba thoracica (Brendel, 1889) i c g

Data sources: i = ITIS, c = Catalogue of Life, g = GBIF, b = Bugguide.net

References

Further reading

 
 

Pselaphinae
Articles created by Qbugbot
Staphylinidae genera